Yassine Boukhari (born 9 June 1986, in Berrouaghia) is an Algerian football player who is currently playing for USM Bel-Abbès in the Algerian Ligue Professionnelle 2. He has been capped by Algeria at the under-23 level.

References

1986 births
Living people
People from Berrouaghia
Algerian footballers
Algerian expatriate footballers
Algerian Ligue Professionnelle 1 players
Algerian Ligue 2 players
Algeria under-23 international footballers
Expatriate footballers in Morocco
ASO Chlef players
USM Bel Abbès players
WA Tlemcen players
Algerian expatriate sportspeople in Morocco
Association football forwards
21st-century Algerian people